Antipterna lithophanes is a species of moth in the family Oecophoridae, first described by Edward Meyrick in 1885 as Ocystola lithophanes. The lectotype for Ocystola lithophanes was collected at Deloraine, Tasmania.  Holotypes for Alfred Jefferis Turner's synonyms were collected from Queensland and New South Wales.

Occurrence data from GBIF shows A. lithophanes occurring in Victoria, and New South Wales.

Meyrick's description

Further reading

References

External links
Antipterna lithophanes: images & occurrence data from GBIF

Oecophorinae
Taxa described in 1885
Taxa named by Edward Meyrick